Country Shindig is a record album containing instrumental-only songs, the majority of which were taken from The Swinging 12 String originally released by The In Group featuring Glen Campbell on twelve string guitar and Leon Russell on harpsichord.

Track listing

Side 1:
 
 "Greenback Dollar" (Axton, Ramsey) - 2:00
 "If I Had a Hammer" (Lee Hays, Pete Seeger) - 2:50
 "Cherry Beat" (Bond) - 2:35
 "Greenfields" (Gilkyson, Dehr, Miller) - 2:20
 "Shindig Hoot" (Public Domain) - 2:17
 
Side 2:
 
 "Cottonfields" (Folkways BMI) - 2:30
 "The Man With The Golden Gun" (Bond) - 2:25
 "Walk Right In" (Cannon, Woods) - 2:17
 "Gospel Harp" (Bond) - 2:07
 "Country Shindig" (Public Domain) - 2:30

1965 compilation albums
Glen Campbell compilation albums